Gita Ghatak (Geeta Ghatak née Ganguly) (23 January 1931 – 17 November 2009) was an Indian actress and singer. She mainly acted in Bengali cinema. Gita Ghatak was also an exponent of Rabindra Sangeet. She had her primary lessons in Tagore songs from celebrated artistes like Sailajaran Majumdar and Indira Debi Choudhurani, having a brief stint in Indian classical music too in her long music career of 65 years. She was closely associated with the All India Radio, Kolkata.
She was also a teacher at South Point School, Kolkata (where she taught all sorts of subjects including English, mathematics, as well as music). Her husband Anish Chandra Ghatak was the nephew of noted Bengali movie director Ritwik Ghatak.

Career
Her notable works include Meghe Dhaka Tara, Bari Theke Paliye, Ekti Nadir Naam.

Selected filmography

References

External links

1931 births
2009 deaths
Indian film actresses
Actresses in Bengali cinema
Rabindra Sangeet exponents
Indian women playback singers
Bengali-language singers
Actresses from Kolkata
Ritwik Ghatak
Singers from Kolkata
20th-century Indian singers
20th-century Indian women singers
20th-century women composers
19th-century women composers
20th-century Indian screenwriters